Brad Newley (born 18 February 1985) is an Australian professional basketball player for Melbourne United of the National Basketball League (NBL). After starting his career in Australia, playing for the Australian Institute of Sport and the Townsville Crocodiles, Newley was drafted 54th overall by the Houston Rockets in the 2007 NBA draft. He never played in the NBA and instead carved out a career in Europe, playing in Greece, Turkey, Lithuania, and Spain between 2007 and 2016. Between 2016 and 2021, he played in the NBL for the Sydney Kings.

Early life and career
Newley was born in Adelaide, South Australia, in the suburb of Lower Mitcham. During his primary school days, he lived in South Australia, Northern Territory, and Queensland. He attended Mountain Creek State High School on the Sunshine Coast before moving back to Adelaide and attending Pasadena High School. He attended Pasadena alongside future NBA player Joe Ingles.

In 2002, Newley played in the Central ABL for the Forestville Eagles. He moved to Canberra in 2003 to attend the Australian Institute of Sport (AIS) and Lake Ginninderra Secondary College. He played for the AIS in the South East Australian Basketball League (SEABL), averaging 17.1 points and 3.9 rebounds per game in 2003, and 24.7 points, 5.5 rebounds and 2.6 assists per game in 2004. To cap off a successful 2004 SEABL season, Newley earned All-Eastern Conference first team honours and won the East Men's Australian Under-23 Youth Player of the Year award.

Professional career

Townsville Crocodiles (2004–2007)
Following the 2004 SEABL season, Newley joined the Townsville Crocodiles of the National Basketball League (NBL). In the 2004–05 season, he was the MVP of the league's All-Star Game and earned Rookie of the Year and Best Sixth Man honours, becoming the first player in league history to win both awards. In 35 games, he averaged 16.0 points, 3.3 rebounds and 1.9 assists per game.

During the 2005 off-season, Newley re-joined the Forestville Eagles of the Central ABL. In six games, he averaged 24.3 points, 9.8 rebounds and 4.0 assists per game.

In the 2005–06 season, Newley averaged 19.3 points, 5.1 rebounds and 4.3 assists in 32 games for the Crocodiles.

After originally declaring for the 2006 NBA draft, Newley later withdrew his name and returned to the Crocodiles for the 2006–07 NBL season. He played in the 2006–07 NBL All-Star Game and was named to the All-NBL Second Team. In 35 games, he averaged 22.1 points, 5.2 rebounds and 3.2 assists per game.

In April 2007, Newley agreed to sign a two-year deal with the Adelaide 36ers.

2007 NBA draft and Summer League
On 28 June 2007, Newley was selected with the 54th overall pick in the 2007 NBA draft by the Houston Rockets. He played for the Rockets in the NBA Summer League, where he averaged 3.3 points, 3.0 rebounds and 1.0 assists in three games with one start.

Panionios and Panellinios (2007–2009)
In August 2007, Newley signed with Panionios for the 2007–08 Greek Basket League season. In just his fourth league game, he scored 32 points, on 12-of-12 shooting, in a win over AEK Athens. By making 8-of-8 three-pointers in the game, he set a new record in the Greek Basket League competition. He was later named to the 2008 Greek League All-Star game. In 26 regular season games in the Greek League, he averaged 10.8 points, 3.5 rebounds, 1.0 assists and 1.3 steals per game, before averaging 8.3 points, 2.6 rebounds, 1.1 assists and 0.9 steals in 12 playoff games.

On 16 July 2008, Newley signed with Panellinios for the 2008–09 Greek Basket League season. In 26 regular season games in the Greek League, he averaged 11.0 points, 4.3 rebounds, 0.8 assists and 1.0 steals per game, before averaging 6.0 points and 5.5 rebounds in two playoff games.

Following the 2008–09 season, Newley once again played for the Houston Rockets in the NBA Summer League, where he averaged 6.8 points and 2.6 rebounds in five games with three starts.

Turkey and Lithuania (2009–2012)
On 21 July 2009, Newley signed with Beşiktaş of the Turkish Basketball Super League for the 2009–10 season.

On 28 May 2010, Newley signed a two-year deal with Lietuvos rytas of the Lithuanian Basketball League.

Spain (2012–2016)
In January 2012, Newley left Lietuvos rytas and signed with Spanish club Valencia of the Liga ACB for the rest of the 2011–12 season.

On 9 August 2012, Newley signed with Spanish club Gran Canaria for the 2012–13 ACB season. He re-signed with Canaria in 2013, 2014 and 2015.

In the 2014–15 season, Newley averaged 10.3 points, 3.5 rebounds, 0.8 assists and 1.1 steals per game, in 32 games played in the Spanish League, and 12.0 points, 3.3 rebounds, 1.1 assists, and 1.0 steals per game in the European-wide 2nd-tier level league, the EuroCup, as his team made it to the 2014–15 EuroCup Finals.

Sydney Kings and AEK Athens (2016–2021)
On 8 June 2016, Newley signed a three-year deal with the Sydney Kings of the Australian NBL. On 17 November 2016, he scored a season-high 34 points in a 93–80 loss to the Perth Wildcats. For the 2016–17 season, he was named to the All-NBL Second Team. Following the NBL season, Newley played in Greece for AEK Athens to complete the 2016–17 Greek League season.

Newley returned to the Kings for the 2017–18 NBL season.

On 29 March 2019, Newley re-signed with the Kings on a two-year deal. In the 2019–20 NBL season, the Kings won the minor premiership with a first-place finish and a 20–8 record and played in the NBL Grand Final series, where they lost 2–1 to the Perth Wildcats.

Melbourne United and Frankston Blues (2021–present)
On 8 July 2021, Newley signed with Melbourne United for the 2021–22 NBL season.

On 17 May 2022, Newley re-signed with United for the 2022–23 NBL season. In December 2022, he played his 300th NBL game.

Newley is set to join the Frankston Blues for the 2023 NBL1 South season.

NBA draft rights
In 2017, Newley's NBA draft rights were traded by the Houston Rockets to the Los Angeles Lakers. In 2022, his draft rights were traded by the Lakers to the New York Knicks.

National team career
Newley was a member of the Australian Under-19 junior national team that won the gold medal at the 2003 FIBA Under-19 World Championship in Greece, where he scored 16 points against Lithuania in the final.

Newley made his senior debut with the Australian national basketball team in 2005. He helped the Boomers win gold at the 2006 Commonwealth Games. Additionally, he was selected in the Boomers squad for the 2006 FIBA World Championship. In this tournament, despite limited game time, he averaged 8.2 points, 2.5 rebounds and 1.3 assists per game. Newley was also selected to play in the 2008 Beijing Summer Olympics. He averaged 12.7 points per game, shooting at 57% from the field and 45% from three-point range during the Olympics.

Newley later represented Australia at the 2010 FIBA World Championship, the 2012 London Summer Olympics, and the 2014 FIBA Basketball World Cup.

Personal life
Newley has one younger sister, Mia, who also plays basketball.

Newley and his wife Brigid have two children.

References

External links
Brad Newley at sydneykings.com
Brad Newley at euroleague.net

Brad Newley at draftexpress.com
Brad Newley at acb.com 
Brad Newley at tblstat.net
Brad Newley's EuroLeague blog

1985 births
Living people
AEK B.C. players
Australian expatriate basketball people in Greece
Australian expatriate basketball people in Lithuania
Australian expatriate basketball people in Spain
Australian expatriate basketball people in Turkey
Australian Institute of Sport basketball players
Australian men's basketball players
Basketball players at the 2006 Commonwealth Games
Basketball players at the 2008 Summer Olympics
Basketball players at the 2012 Summer Olympics
Basketball players at the 2018 Commonwealth Games
BC Rytas players
Beşiktaş men's basketball players
CB Gran Canaria players
Commonwealth Games gold medallists for Australia
Commonwealth Games medallists in basketball
Greek Basket League players
Houston Rockets draft picks
Liga ACB players
Melbourne United players
Olympic basketball players of Australia
Panellinios B.C. players
Panionios B.C. players
People educated at Lake Ginninderra College
Shooting guards
Small forwards
Basketball players from Adelaide
Sydney Kings players
Townsville Crocodiles players
Valencia Basket players
2006 FIBA World Championship players
2010 FIBA World Championship players
2014 FIBA Basketball World Cup players
Medallists at the 2018 Commonwealth Games